North Richland Hills/Iron Horse station is a TEXRail commuter rail station in North Richland Hills, Texas.

Services

TEXRail
North Richland Hills/Iron Horse was an opening day station when revenue service began on December 31, 2018. A mixed-use, transit-oriented development, Iron Horse Village, is in the works nearby, which would include up to 469 apartments, office buildings, a commercial area, restaurants, shops, and bakeries. The development would cost $70 million, would be 100 acres large, and the first apartments would be available in the spring of 2017, roughly 1 year before the station's opening.

Gallery

References

External links
TEXRail
FWTA Station Concept

Railway stations in the United States opened in 2019
2019 establishments in Texas
TEXRail stations
Railway stations in Tarrant County, Texas